The 2015–16 Bulgarian women's football championship was the 31st season of women's league football under the Bulgarian Football Union.

The season was played from 5 September 2015 to the end on 28 May 2016. The defending champions were NSA Sofia.

FC NSA Sofia won their 13th consecutive championship and qualified to the 2016–17 UEFA Women's Champions League.

League table

References

External links
Women's Football Bulgarian Football Union
Premier League Women 2016 Soccrway

Bulgaria
Women